The Franklin O-265 (company designation 6AC-264) was an American air-cooled aircraft engine of the early 1940s. The engine was of six-cylinder, horizontally-opposed layout and displaced . The 6ACG-264 featured a geared propeller drive.

Variants
6AC-264 at 2,600 rpm

6ACG-264 at 3,100 rpm

Applications
Bellanca Cruisair
Northrop N-1M
Vultee Stinson Model 75

Specifications (6AC-264)

See also

References

Notes

Bibliography

 Gunston, Bill. (1986) World Encyclopedia of Aero Engines. Patrick Stephens: Wellingborough. p. 57

Franklin aircraft engines
1940s aircraft piston engines
Boxer engines